Kiplan Paul "Kip" Harkrider (born September 16, 1975) is a former professional baseball player and an Olympic bronze medalist in baseball. His minor league baseball career spanned from 1997 to 2007. He was born in Carthage, Texas.

References 
 Kip Harkrider at Baseball Reference (minors)
 

1975 births
Living people
Baseball players from Texas
Baseball players at the 1996 Summer Olympics
Olympic bronze medalists for the United States in baseball
San Antonio Missions players
Medalists at the 1996 Summer Olympics
Texas Longhorns baseball players